Barrie Roberts (Hampshire, 1939 – 2007) was an English author, folk singer, freelance journalist, and criminal lawyer.

Biography
Born in Hampshire in 1939, Roberts was educated at Churcher's College.

As a lawyer, Roberts worked for two firms in the West Midlands and at one he was a part of the appeal for the Birmingham Six. As an instructor, Roberts taught courses on Ghosts and Unsolved Mysteries and has also lectured on the Assassination of President John F. Kennedy.

Roberts was a member of the Gypsy council and interested himself in the treatment of Gypsies and other travellers.

Bibliography

Chris Tyroll
Victory Snapshot  (1997)
Robbery With Malice  (1999)
Bad Penny Blues  (2000)
Crowner & Justice  (2002)

Further Adventures of Sherlock Holmes

Novels
Sherlock Holmes and the Railway Maniac  (1994)
Sherlock Holmes and the Devil's Grail  (1995)
Sherlock Holmes and the Man from Hell  (1997)
Sherlock Holmes and the Royal Flush  (1998)
Sherlock Holmes and the Harvest Of Death  (1999)
Sherlock Holmes and the Crosby Murder  (2001)
Sherlock Holmes and the Rule of Nine  (2003)
Sherlock Holmes and the King's Governess  (2005)
Sherlock Holmes and the American Angels (2007)

Short stories
The Disappearance of Daniel Question (The Strand Magazine #4 2000)
The Abbus Parva Tragedy: The Mystery of the Christmas Pie (The Strand Magazine Christmas 2001)
The Affair of the Christmas Jewel (The Strand Magazine Christmas 2002)
The Affair of the Christmas Candle (The Strand Magazine Christmas 2003)
The Mystery of the Addleton Curse (The Mammoth Book of New Sherlock Holmes Adventures)
The Affair of the Weeping Child  (Unpublished)Personal Correspondence

Non-fiction
Midland Ghosts and Hauntings (1994)
Midland Murders and Mysteries (1997)
Midland Spirits and Spectres (1998)
Murder in the Midlands (2000)
A Taste of Murder (2004)

References

1939 births
2007 deaths
Writers from Hampshire
English essayists
English crime fiction writers
People educated at Churcher's College
British male essayists
English male novelists
20th-century English novelists
20th-century essayists
20th-century English male writers
English male non-fiction writers
20th-century English lawyers